Lake Seneca is a census-designated place in Williams County, in the U.S. state of Ohio.

History
Lake Seneca had its start in 1966 as a lakeside planned community.

References

Unincorporated communities in Williams County, Ohio
Unincorporated communities in Ohio